Veregin is a special service area in Saskatchewan, Canada. It is located 50 kilometres northeast of Yorkton, and 10 km to the west of Kamsack.

Veregin was incorporated as a village in 1912 and was named after Veregin Station (built 1908), and misspelled by the railroad when it earlier built Veregin Siding in 1904, named after Peter V. Verigin. The Veregin railway station is served by Via Rail.

History 
Veregin owes its existence to the Doukhobors, in the middle of whose 1899 block settlement, known as the South Doukobor Colony its future site happened to be, and the Canadian Northern Railway, whose new line (between Kamsack and Canora) crossed the reserve in 1904. The site of the future village of Veregin — which also happened to be the closest point where the new rail line came to the village of Otradnoye (some 10 km north of Veregin) where the residence and headquarters of the Doukhobor leader, Peter Verigin was at the time — was chosen as the place for the railway station to serve the Doukhobor reserve.

The new station, originally known as Veregin Siding, and since 1908 as Veregin station, was named after Peter Verigin.
(Veregin appears a common spelling variant of the surname Verigin, fairly common among the Doukhobors. In fact, the village name is spelt as Verigin''' on the letterhead of Peter Verigin-led  Christian Community of Universal Brotherhood in the 1920s, and, on occasions, in the report of BC Royal Commission of 1912.)

A new village started to be growing near the Veregin train station. Peter Verigin moved his residence and the headquarters to Veregin from Otradnoye in 1904,. The BC Royal Commission report of 1912 mentions the village (spelt as Verigin'') as the site of what it terms "the head office of the Doukhobor Community".

Veregin soon became an important Doukhobor settlement in the region.  Brickworks, grain elevators, a floor mill were built there.
While the early annual general meetings of the Doukhobor Community continued to take place in the village of Nadezhda, some 10 km to the north of Veregin, Veregin became the site of the annual meetings no later than January 1910.

When the Peter Verigin-led Doukhobor Community was legally incorporated as the Christian Community of Universal Brotherhood (CCUB) in 1917, the headquarters of the organization was based in the village of Veregin as well, even though the majority of the CCUB members had already moved to British Columbia by that time. CCUB headquarters remained in Veregin until its relocation to British Columbia in 1931.

With the bankruptcy of CCUB in 1937–38, the facilities owned by the community were sold or destroyed.

In 1980, the 1917-built Verigin's mansion was restored. In 2006, it and a few other Doukhobor buildings have been designated a National Historic Site of Canada under the name "Doukhobors at Veregin".

Two major fires in the community on January 22 and 29, 2004, threatened the viability of the village. Veregin's status as a village was dissolved on December 31, 2006 when it was absorbed into the surrounding Rural Municipality of Sliding Hills No. 273 as a special service area.

Demographics 

References 

Designated places in Saskatchewan
Former villages in Saskatchewan
Special service areas in Saskatchewan
Sliding Hills No. 273, Saskatchewan
Populated places disestablished in 2006
Ethnic enclaves in Saskatchewan
Division No. 9, Saskatchewan